is a Japanese voice actress and singer from Fukuoka Prefecture, Japan. She was a member of the Japanese idol group AŌP from 2018 to 2021. Hoshiki took hiatus from voice acting in September 2022 due to acute lymphocytic leukemia.

Early life
Seena Hoshiki was born on October 11 in Fukuoka Prefecture, Japan. She originally wanted to become a preschool teacher until she accompanied her friend for a singing audition during her first year in high school and passed auditions to join Sony Music Artists.

Career
Hoshiki joined the Japanese idol group AOP Zero in 2017 until she was promoted to its sister group AŌP in March 2018. She remained in the group until its disbandment in March 2021. In September 2022, Sony Music Artists announced Hoshiki's hiatus from voice acting after she was diagnosed with acute lymphocytic leukemia.

Filmography

Anime
2021
Selection Project as Boy (ep 11)

Web anime
2020
The Idolmaster Cinderella Girls Theater: Extra Stage as Riamu Yumemi

Video games
2018
WAR OF BRAINS Re:Boot as Sayonaki, Polo
2019
Brown Dust as Salvia
The Idolmaster Cinderella Girls/Starlight Stage as Riamu Yumemi
2020
BATON=RELAY as Ririka Jingū
Vivid Army as Fūka
2021
Shadowverse as Riamu Yumemi

TV Shows
2021
Koewaza no Eiyū (October 10th)

Stage Shows
2018
Bakusou Adult Elementary School 5th Special Class "Bakusou Adult Elementary School. (October 17-21, Shinjukumura LIVE) as Penelope
2019
Bakusou Adult Elementary School 10th All-School Assembly "Primary Education Royal" (May 29-June 2, Zenrosai Hall / Space Zero)-Mrs. Ito
2021
Feather stage "THE END OF Commuter Express Daibakuha" (May 29-June 6, Theater KASSAI) as Mifune Eien (Team A)
Wado no Ashura (December 10-12, Kyoto Theater) as Nene

Recitation Drama
2022
Act Session vol.1 "Kishō Tenketsu"

Mixed Media
2014
Onsen Musume (Yata Yamashiro)

Discography

Character Songs

References

External links
Official agency profile 

1999 births
Living people
Japanese women pop singers
Japanese video game actresses
Japanese voice actresses
Voice actresses from Fukuoka Prefecture
21st-century Japanese actresses
21st-century Japanese singers
21st-century Japanese women singers